The Jambyl Kazakh State Philharmonic is a creative association created on 14 January 1935 by the Decree of the Council of People's Commissars of the Kazakh SSR. It was originally organized by the Kazakh musicologist Akhmet Zhubanov as a regional art and concert organization. Since 1938, it bears the name of the famous Kazakh akyn Zhambyl Zhabayuly.

The Philharmonic holds the annual spring music festival Zhiger, Children's Music Week, concerts of national and symphonic music, lecture halls and other events.

History 
The philharmonic society included a dombra orchestra, a national choir, a large orchestra of national instruments which has been named after Kurmangazy since 1944, a string quartet, the Kazakh-Russian song and dance ensemble Jetysu and a national orchestra, renamed in 1939 into the State Choir Capella.

From 1937 to 1938 the director of the philharmonic society was Khamza Esenzhanov.

In 1939, a symphony orchestra was organized under the direction of Ivanov-Sokolovsky and Shargorodsky. Dina Nurpeisova, Zhappas Kalambaev, Malik Zhappasbayev, Zhusupbek Elebekov, Kosymzhan Babakov, Manarbek Yerzhanov, Shara Zhienkulova and others made a contribution to the development of the philharmonic society.

In the 1970s and 1980s, Zhania Aubakirova, Aiman Musakhodzhaeva, Gaukhar Myrzabekova, Galina Moldakarimova and others performed on the stage of the Kazakh Philharmonic.

Collectives 
Currently, the Philharmonic includes six collectives:

 State Academic Symphony Orchestra of the Republic of Kazakhstan
 State Brass Band of the Republic of Kazakhstan
 Tlendieva Academic Folklore and Ethnographic Orchestra
 State Woodwind Quintet;
 Baikadamov State Choir
 Zhubanova State String Quartet

Building 
The Philharmonic building was built from 1933 to 1936 as the Palace of Culture by Leningrad architects D. Fomin, E. Tseitlin, designer V. Railean. The artists E. Sidorkin and O. Bogomolov took part in the project. Up to the construction of the Palace of Sports. In the 50th Anniversary of October Revolution in 1967, the building remained the largest concert venue in the republic.

During World War II, the Central United Film Studio (TsOKS) was located here, which united the leading film studios of the country, where outstanding filmmakers worked: S. Eisenstein, the Vasilyev brothers, N. Cherkasov, B. Babochkin, M. Bernes, I. Pyriev, M. Zharov, G. Kozintsev, V. Maretskaya and others.

From 1983 to 1985, reconstruction was carried out according to the project of architects Y. Ratushny, T. Eraliev, O. Balykbaev, designer Zh. Syzdykov, after which the Kazakhconcert settled here. The auditorium, decorated with a portrait gallery of the founders of Kazakh music, is distinguished by its special acoustics.

References 

Kazakhstani culture